Dr. Keith F. Otterbein (1936–2015) was an Emeritus Professor of Anthropology at the University at Buffalo (SUNYAB), in the United States.

Dr. Otterbein was a past president of the Human Relations Area Files and a frequent contributor to cross-cultural research, primarily in warfare related topics.

Otterbein is the author of How War Began (2004), in which he explored the origins of warfare in human society.

He died on June 17, 2015, at age 79.

Publications 
The Evolution of Zulu Warfare, 1964, Kansas Journal of Sociology.
Internal War: A Cross-Cultural Study, 1968, American Anthropologist.
Higi Armed Combat, 1978, Southwestern Journal of Anthropology.
The Evolution of War: A Cross-Cultural Study, 1970 HRAF Press, New Haven. (2nd Ed. 1985)
Killing of Captured Enemies: A Cross-Cultural Study, 2000 Current Anthropology.
How War Began, 2004, Texas A&M University Press, College Station.

References 
 Keith F. Otterbein
 978-2-88124-621-0 Feuding and Warfare - Book Review
 obituarie

1936 births
2015 deaths
University at Buffalo alumni
University at Buffalo faculty
Anthropology educators